Psalms 152 to 155 are additional Psalms found in two Syriac biblical manuscripts to date and several manuscripts of 's "Book of Discipline", first identified by the orientalist librarian Giuseppe Simone Assemani in 1759. Together with Psalm 151 they are also called the Five Apocryphal Psalms of David or the "Five Syriac Psalms".

Psalms 152-155

Psalm 152
"Spoken by David when he was contending with the lion and the wolf which took a sheep from his flock." This text has survived only in Syriac although the original language may have been Hebrew. The text has six verses, the tone is non-rabbinical, and it was probably composed in Israel during the Hellenistic period (c. 323–31 BC).

Psalm 153
"Spoken by David when returning thanks to God, who had delivered him from the lion and the wolf and he had slain both of them." This text has survived only in Syriac. Date and provenance are like Psalm 152. It is listed as the fifth of the apocryphal psalms by Wright.

Psalm 154
This Psalm survived in Syriac biblical manuscripts and also was found in Hebrew, in the Dead Sea scroll 11QPs(a)154 (also known as 11Q5 – The Great Psalms Scroll), a first-century AD manuscript. It is listed as the second of the apocryphal psalms by Wright who calls it "The Prayer of Hezekiah when enemies surrounded him".

Psalm 155
This psalm is extant in Syriac and was also found in the Dead Sea Scroll 11QPs(a)155 (also called 11Q5 – The Great Psalms Scroll), a first-century CE Hebrew manuscript. The theme of this psalm is similar to Psalm 22, and due to the lack of peculiarities it is impossible to suggest date and origin, save that its origin is clearly pre-Christian.

See also
Biblical canon

References

External links
5 Apocryphal Psalms of David
5 Syriac Apocryphal Psalms

1st-century BCE texts
2nd-century BCE texts
3rd-century BCE texts
4th-century BCE texts
Dead Sea Scrolls
Jewish apocrypha
Jewish texts in Aramaic
Jewish texts
Old Testament pseudepigrapha
Psalms
Texts in Hebrew
Texts in Syriac
Works attributed to David